"Keep This Heart in Mind" is a song recorded by Bonnie Raitt in 1981, for her 1982 album Green Light. It was the only single released from the LP. The song was written by Fred Marrone/Steve Holsapple.

In the U.S., "Keep This Heart in Mind" peaked at number 104 on the Billboard Bubbling Under the Hot 100 singles chart and number 39 on the Top Rock Tracks chart.

Charts

References

External links
 

1981 songs
1982 singles
Bonnie Raitt songs
Song recordings produced by Rob Fraboni
Warner Records singles